Model Colony Karachi  is a neighborhood in Karachi, Pakistan, that is within Korangi District. It is situated on the outskirts of the city about two miles northeast of Jinnah International Airport, Karachi's international airport. Other important buildings in the vicinity are the Security Press, which is Pakistan's mint, and the SOS Village, which houses about 200 orphans.

Currently, it is divided into two Union Councils.

Most of the residents in this neighborhood belong to the Muhajir community tracing their roots to Uttar Pradesh and Bihar.

History
According to local folklore, the Model Colony was envisioned by Fatima Jinnah, the sister of Pakistan's founder Muhammad Ali Jinnah, and Syed Mohammad Hussain Qadri, who was very close to her and her brother. She asked the town planner, Mr. Makki, to lay out a plan for a 'model Muhajir colony'. It was a favored residential area for Karachi's elite until the mid-1980s.

The colony has seen sustained deterioration as a result of increased population and ethnic riots that reached their peak from the mid-1980s to the mid-1990s. Following the formation of the Pakistani local government system in 2000, there have been improvements to the sewerage system and road network and now approximately 85% of the houses in the colony have access to the sewerage system.

On 22 May 2020, Pakistan International Airlines Flight 8303, an Airbus A320 aircraft, crashed in the Jinnah Garden area of Model Colony during final approach to Jinnah International Airport. Several buildings were damaged, while 97 of the aircraft's 99 occupants and one person on the ground were killed.

Notable residents 
 Saeed Azad (national cricketer)
 Rashid Latif (national cricketer)
 Saeed Anwar (national cricketer)
 Basit Ali (national cricketer)
 Asim Kamal (national cricketer)
 Mirza Iqbal Baig (Sports journalist / TV anchor)
 Rizwan Malik (cricketer) 
 Maham Tariq (national women's cricketer)
 Aasia Ishaque (Secretary Information of APML)
 Faseeh Ahmad (Social Executive of TJMWT (Regd)

References 

Neighbourhoods of Karachi